Ribosomal oxygenase 1 is a protein that in humans is encoded by the RIOX1 gene.

References

Further reading

External links 
 PDBe-KB provides an overview of all the structure information available in the PDB for Human Ribosomal oxygenase 1 (RIOX1)

Human proteins